Christopher George Manak (born October 8, 1969 ), better known by his stage name Peanut Butter Wolf, is an American disc jockey and record producer from San Jose, California.  He is based in Los Angeles, where he moved to in 2000. He is the founder of Stones Throw Records.

Career
In 1989, Peanut Butter Wolf met rapper Charizma. They became friends and started making music together. They made a name for themselves in San Jose and the Bay Area through their live shows and demo tapes. Charizma was shot dead in 1993. In 1996, Peanut Butter Wolf founded Stones Throw Records, which would release the duo's Big Shots in 2003.

In 1999, Peanut Butter Wolf released My Vinyl Weighs a Ton. It peaked at number 44 on the UK Independent Albums Chart. In 2010, Jeff Weiss of Los Angeles Times called it "a crate-digging classic that remains one of the seminal statements of the underground golden era."

Discography

Studio albums
 My Vinyl Weighs a Ton (1999)
 Big Shots (2003)

Compilation albums
 Peanut Butter Breaks (1994)
 Peanut Butter Wolf's Jukebox 45's (2002)
 Chrome Children (2006)
 Chrome Children Vol. 2 (2007)
 B-Ball Zombie War (2007)
 Straight to Tape 1990-1992 (2009)
 Circa 1990-1993 (2014)

Mixtapes
 Fusion Beats (2002)
 Badmeaningood Vol.3 (2003)
 666 Mix (2006)
 Chrome Mix (2006)
 Zombie Playoffs (2007)
 Ladies First (2007)
 Be Our Valentine (2008)

EPs
 Step on Our Ego's? (1996)
 Lunar Props (1996)
 Styles, Crews, Flows, Beats (1998)
 Big Shots Bonus EP (2004)

Singles
 "My World Premiere" (1996) 
 "Run the Line" / "The Undercover (Clear & Present Danger)" (1997)
 "Definition of Ill" (1999)
 "Tale of Five Cities" (1999)
 "Devotion" (2000) 
 "Here's a Smirk" (2003) 
 "Jack the Mack" (2003)

Guest appearances
 BT - "Love on Haight Street" from Movement in Still Life (1999)
 Deltron 3030 - "St. Catherine St." from Deltron 3030 (2000)
 Scuba Chicken- "Butane Fuel on da BBC" and "Voicemail" from Quantity Over Quality (2004) 
 Scuba Chicken - "Stop Calling Me" from Let's Play Doctor (2006)

Productions
 Kool Keith - "Wanna Be a Star" (1996)

References

External links

 Peanut Butter Wolf at Stones Throw Records
 
 

Living people
Musicians from San Jose, California
American hip hop DJs
American hip hop record producers
Stones Throw Records artists
Record producers from California
1969 births